Johnny Joyce (August 22, 1876 – May 17, 1957) was an American track and field athlete who competed in the 1904 Summer Olympics. He competed in the 800 metres. He finished outside of the top six in what was a straight final.

See also 
 United States at the 1904 Summer Olympics

References

External links
 

1876 births
1957 deaths
American male middle-distance runners
Olympic track and field athletes of the United States
Athletes (track and field) at the 1904 Summer Olympics
20th-century American people